This is a list of castles and fortresses in Azerbaijan. There are a lot of castles in Azerbaijan which were built in the Ancient and Medieval Times. Thus the names of some castles have "qala", "divar" or "qüllə" suffixes.

Karabakh Region

Absheron Region

Ganjabasar Region

Shaki-Zaqatala Region

Castles in Janub (South) Region

Shimal (North) Region

Aran Region

Shirvan Region

Nakhchivan Autonomous Republic

See also
 List of castles

External links
 
 Historical monuments Azerbaijans.com

References

Azerbaijan
Azerbaijan
Castles
Azerbaijan
Castles